The Great Contraction is the recessionary period from 1929 until 1933, i.e., the early years of the Great Depression, as characterized by economist Milton Friedman. The phrase was the title of a chapter in the landmark 1963 book A Monetary History of the United States by Friedman and his fellow monetarist Anna Schwartz. The chapter was later published as a stand-alone book titled The Great Contraction, 1929–1933 in 1965. Both books are still in print from Princeton University Press and some editions include as an appendix a speech honoring Nobel-memorial economics prize laureate Friedman in which Fed Governor Ben Bernanke made this statement:

Let me end my talk by abusing slightly my status as an official representative of the Federal Reserve. I would like to say to Milton and Anna: Regarding the Great Depression, you're right. We did it. We're very sorry. But thanks to you, we won't do it again. 
— Ben S. Bernanke 

Friedman and Schwartz argued that the Federal Reserve could have lessened the severity of the Depression, but failed to exercise its role of managing the monetary system and ameliorating banking panics under Fed chairmen Roy A. Young and Eugene Meyer.

The Great Contraction is not to be confused with the Great Compression, which refers to a period beginning around 1940 when (according to some economists such as Paul Krugman) economic inequality declined due to progressive taxation and other policies of the Franklin D. Roosevelt administration.

See also
Causes of the Great Depression
Criticism of the Federal Reserve

References

Federal Reserve System
Milton Friedman
Monetary policy of the United States
Great Depression in the United States
Non-fiction books about the Great Depression
Eras of United States history
Presidency of Herbert Hoover